Jonathan C. Hudson (January 24, 1919 – April 8, 1996) was an American actor who appeared in the films Gunfight at the O.K. Corral with Burt Lancaster and G.I. Blues with Elvis Presley.

Biography
Born and raised in Gilroy, California, Hudson served in the U.S. Army Air Forces during World War II, where he attained the rank of second lieutenant, and then embarked on his acting career. In the 1940s, he was married to film/TV actress Mary LaRoche.

He made guest appearances on numerous television shows, such as Dragnet 1967, 77 Sunset Strip, I Dream of Jeannie, Sea Hunt, Gunsmoke, and Adam-12.

Hudson acted on Broadway in The Eve of St. Mark, Junior Miss, Craig's Wife, and January Thaw.

Death
Hudson died at age 77 on April 8, 1996, in Los Angeles, California.

Filmography

References

External links

1919 births
1996 deaths
Male actors from California
American male film actors
American male television actors
People from Gilroy, California
20th-century American male actors
Burials at Los Angeles National Cemetery
United States Army Air Forces personnel of World War II